Aleksander Borejko Chodźko (30 August 1804 – 27 December 1891) was a Polish poet, Slavist, and Iranologist.

Early life
He was born in Krzywicze, in the Minsk Governorate of the Russian Empire (present-day Belarus) and attended the Imperial University of Vilnius. He was a member of the Filaret Association and the Institute of Oriental Studies that was attached to the Ministry of Foreign Affairs of the Russian Empire in Saint Petersburg.

Career
From 1830 until 1844 he worked as a Russian diplomat in Iran. From 1852 until 1855 he worked for the French Foreign Ministry in Paris. He succeeded Adam Mickiewicz in the chair of Slavic languages and literatures in the Collège de France, holding the post from 1857 until 1883.

He was a member of the Royal Asiatic Society of Great Britain and Ireland and the Société de Linguistique de Paris.

Partial bibliography

Persia
 Popular Poetry of Persia. Specimens of the popular poetry of Persia, orally collected and translated with philological and historical notes. London: Oriental Translation Fund, 1842.
 Specimens of the Popular Poetry of Persia. London, 1842.
 Theatre persan. Paris, 1878.
 Le Deisme des ti'ahhabis in the Journal Asiatique, series iv. vol. xi. pp. 168.
 The Chodzko Collection. 33 scripts collected Chodźko preserved in the Bibliothèque Nationale of Paris. Also known as The Islamic Drama by Jamshid Malekpour.

Slav
 Polish-English and English-Polish Dictionary (1851)
 Fairy Tales of the Slav Peasants and Herdsmen. London. (Translated by Emily J. Harding)
 The Twelve Months: A Slav Legend appeared in Good Stories for Great Holidays, by Frances J. Olcott (2006 BiblioBazaar, LLC)
 Les chants historiques de l'Ukraine (Paris; reprinted by Bibliolife, 2008). 284 pp.

Ballads and poems
 Ballad Maliny
 Poezye Alex. St. Petersburg, 1828 (2nd edition, Poznan, 1833).

References

Further reading
 Aleksander Chodzko (1804–1891) and his "Oriental" Poems by Anna Krasnowolska. Polska Akademia Nauk oddz. Kraków, 2003.
 The Oldest Known Texts in New Tabari: The Collection of Aleksander Chodźko by Habib Borjian, Archiv Orientální Vol. 74, No. 2, 2006. This journal is published by the Oriental Institute, Academy of Sciences of the Czech Republic (ASCR).

External links

 
  
 Alexander Chodzko as the forerunner of unveiling the Azerbaijani culture in the west, par Ihar Lalkoŭ, М.А., History, Center for East European Studies, University of Warsaw - pdf - pages 20–22 ; 
 Аляксандр Ходзька 
Genealogy 
 

1804 births
1891 deaths
People from Myadzyel District
People from Vileysky Uyezd
Polish orientalists
Kurdologists
Vilnius University alumni
Academic staff of the Collège de France
People from the Russian Empire of Polish descent
Russian expatriates in Iran